The Ireland women's national squash team represents Ireland in international squash team competitions, and is governed by Irish Squash Federation.

Since 1967, Ireland has won one Bronze medal of the World Squash Team Open, in 1979.

Current team
 Madeline Perry
 Aisling Blake
 Laura Mylotte
 Breanne Flynn

Results

World Team Squash Championships

See also
 Irish Squash Federation
 World Team Squash Championships
 Ireland men's national squash team

References

Squash
Squash teams
Women's national squash teams